The 1978 Davis Cup was the 67th edition of the Davis Cup, the most important tournament between national teams in men's tennis. 50 teams entered the competition, 29 in the Europe Zone, 10 in the Americas Zone, and 11 in the Eastern Zone.

The United States defeated Chile in the Americas Inter-Zonal final, Australia defeated New Zealand in the Eastern Zone final, and Great Britain and Sweden were the winners of the two Europe Zones, defeating Czechoslovakia and Hungary respectively.

In the Inter-Zonal Zone, the United States defeated Sweden and Great Britain defeated Australia in the semifinals. The United States then defeated Great Britain in the final to win their 25th title overall and their first since 1972. The final was held at the Mission Hills Country Club in Rancho Mirage, California, United States on 8–10 December.

Political controversy
The competition was significantly marked by political issues: Canada, Mexico, Venezuela, and the Caribbean/West Indies all withdrew from the North & Central America Zone due to the continued presence of South Africa in the competition, despite continued international condemnation of their government's apartheid policies.

The North & Central America Zone final between the United States and South Africa, held at Vanderbilt University, Nashville, Tennessee, attracted crowds of up to 5,000 protesters each day, and efforts by the South African side to appease critics by nominating Peter Lamb as its first "coloured" player were derided by some as tokenism, given he did not actually play during the tie and was a student enrolled at Vanderbilt University at the time of the tournament.

The Soviet Union continued to be barred for competing following its refusal to compete against Chile in the 1976 semifinals and its promised refusal to compete against South Africa.

Americas Zone

North & Central America Zone

South America Zone

Preliminary rounds

Main Draw

Americas Inter-Zonal Final
Chile vs. United States

Eastern Zone

Preliminary rounds

Main Draw

Final
Australia vs. New Zealand

Europe Zone

Zone A

Preliminary rounds

Main Draw

Final
Great Britain vs. Czechoslovakia

Zone B

Pre-qualifying round

Preliminary rounds

Main Draw

Final
Sweden vs. Hungary

Inter-Zonal Zone

Draw

Semifinals
Sweden vs. United States

Great Britain vs. Australia

Final
United States vs. Great Britain

References

External links
Davis Cup Official Website

 
Davis Cups by year
Davis Cup
Davis Cup
Davis Cup
Davis Cup
Davis Cup
Davis Cup
1978 controversies
1978 in sports in Tennessee
Vanderbilt University